Nightingale Hospital can mean:

Nightingale Hospital (Marylebone), a private mental health facility in Marylebone, London
NHS Nightingale Hospitals, temporary critical care hospitals established in the United Kingdom during the 2020 coronavirus pandemic
NHS Nightingale Hospital London, within East London's ExCeL centre
NHS Nightingale Hospital Birmingham, within the city's National Exhibition Centre
NHS Nightingale Hospital North West, within Manchester Central
NHS Nightingale Hospital North East, in Sunderland
NHS Nightingale Hospital Yorkshire and the Humber, within Harrogate Convention Centre
NHS Louisa Jordan Hospital in Glasgow, Scotland
Florence Nightingale Field Hospital, Gibraltar

See also

 NHS COVID-19 critical care hospitals, sometimes referred to as "Nightingale Hospitals" (of which a subset are)
 St Thomas' Hospital, London, UK; the hospital at which Florence Nightingale taught
 Florence Nightingale Faculty of Nursing and Midwifery, the hospital teaching faculty that Florence Nightingale established
 Nightingale ward, a type of hospital ward
 
 
 Nightingale (disambiguation)
 Hospital (disambiguation)